Ribes quercetorum is a species of currant known by the common names rock gooseberry, oak gooseberry and oakwoods gooseberry. It is native to the mountains and hills of California from the San Francisco Bay Area south into Baja California and east into Arizona.

Ribes quercetorum grows in woodlands, chaparral, and dry desert slopes and canyons. It is a spreading shrub producing arching stems up to 1.5 meters (5 feet)long, the nodes along the stems bearing 1 to 3 spines each up to 1.5 centimeters (0.6 inch) long. The lightly hairy, glandular leaves are up to 3 centimeters (1.2 inches) long and are divided into a few lobes which are toothed or lobed at their tips. The inflorescence is a raceme of 2 or 3 small flowers. Each flower has five reflexed yellow sepals around a tube-shaped ring of smaller cream-colored petals. The fruit is a spherical, edible black berry just under a centimeter (0.4 inch) in diameter.

References

External links

Jepson Manual Treatment
Calphotos Photo gallery, University of California
photo of herbarium specimen at Missouri Botanical Garden, collected inside Anza Borrego Desert State Park in California, 2005

quercetorum
Plants described in 1885
Flora of Arizona
Flora of Baja California
Flora of California
Flora without expected TNC conservation status